Tage Fahlborg (April 24, 1912 – January 8, 2005) was a Swedish sprint canoeist who competed in the late 1930s. He won a bronze medal in the K-2 10000 m event at the 1936 Summer Olympics in Berlin.

References
DatabaseOlympics.com profile
Sports-reference.com profile

1912 births
2005 deaths
Canoeists at the 1936 Summer Olympics
Olympic canoeists of Sweden
Olympic bronze medalists for Sweden
Swedish male canoeists
Olympic medalists in canoeing

Medalists at the 1936 Summer Olympics
20th-century Swedish people
21st-century Swedish people